William, Will, Bill, or Billy Gill may refer to:

Arts and entertainment
 William Ward Gill (1823–1894), English painter, brother of Edmund Marriner Gill
 William Henry Gill (composer) (1839–1923), Manx composer
 William B. Gill (1842–1919), American actor and playwright; author of Broadway's first hit musical, Adonis
 William Gill (photographer) (1854–1912), British photographer
 W. Walter Gill (William Walter Gill, 1876–1963), Manx scholar, folklorist and poet
 Will Gill (born 1968), Canadian artist

Sports
 Billy Gill (1876–1930), Australian rules footballer
 Bill Gill (soccer) (1919–?), Canadian soccer goalkeeper 
 William Gill (boxer) (fl. 2007–2009), American boxer

Others
 William Gill (sea captain) (1795–1858), Manx master mariner
 William Wyatt Gill (1828–1896), English missionary
 William Gill (explorer) (1843–1882), British explorer and intelligence gatherer, companion of William Mesny
 William H. Gill (1886–1976), U.S. Army general
 William Henry Gill (ethnographer) (1861–1944), Australian ethnographer
 William Smith Gill (1865–1957), Scottish Volunteer Force officer and paint manufacturer
 William R. Gill, American diplomat

See also
 William McGill (disambiguation)
 William Gillies (disambiguation)